In mathematics, Baire functions are functions obtained from continuous functions by transfinite iteration of the operation of forming pointwise limits of sequences of functions. They were introduced by René-Louis Baire in 1899. A Baire set is a set whose characteristic function is a Baire function. (There are other similar, but inequivalent definitions of Baire sets.)

Classification of Baire functions
Baire functions of class α, for any countable ordinal number α, form a vector space of real-valued functions defined on a topological space, as follows.

The Baire class 0 functions are the continuous functions.
The Baire class 1 functions are those functions which are the pointwise limit of a sequence of Baire class 0 functions.
In general, the Baire class α functions are all functions which are the pointwise limit of a sequence of functions of Baire class less than α.

Some authors define the classes slightly differently, by removing all functions of class less than α from the functions of class α. This means that each Baire function has a well defined class, but the functions of given class no longer form a vector space.

Henri Lebesgue proved that (for functions on the unit interval) each Baire class of a countable ordinal number contains functions not in any smaller class, and that there exist functions which are not in any Baire class.

Baire class 1
Examples:
The derivative of any differentiable function is of class 1. An example of a differentiable function whose derivative is not continuous (at x = 0) is the function equal to  when x ≠ 0, and 0 when x = 0. An infinite sum of similar functions (scaled and displaced by rational numbers) can even give a differentiable function whose derivative is discontinuous on a dense set. However, it necessarily has points of continuity, which follows easily from The Baire Characterisation Theorem (below; take K = X = R).
The characteristic function of the set of integers, which equals 1 if x is an integer and 0 otherwise. (An infinite number of large discontinuities.)
Thomae's function, which is 0 for irrational x and 1/q for a rational number p/q (in reduced form). (A dense set of discontinuities, namely the set of rational numbers.)
The characteristic function of the Cantor set, which equals 1 if x is in the Cantor set and 0 otherwise. This function is 0 for an uncountable set of x values, and 1 for an uncountable set. It is discontinuous wherever it equals 1 and continuous wherever it equals 0. It is approximated by the continuous functions , where  is the distance of x from the nearest point in the Cantor set.

The Baire Characterisation Theorem states that a real valued function f defined on a Banach space X is a Baire-1 function if and only if for every non-empty closed subset K of X, the restriction of f to K has a point of continuity relative to the topology of K.

By another theorem of Baire, for every Baire-1 function the points of continuity are a comeager Gδ set .

Baire class 2

An example of a Baire class 2 function on the interval [0,1] that is not of class 1 is the characteristic function of the rational numbers, also known as the Dirichlet function which is discontinuous everywhere.

Baire class 3
An example of such functions is given by the indicator of the set of normal numbers, which is a Borel set of rank 3.

See also

Baire set
Nowhere continuous function

References

.
.

Inline references

External links
 Springer Encyclopaedia of Mathematics article on Baire classes

General topology
Real analysis
Types of functions